Random (02) is a remix album by Gary Numan, released in 1998 on Beggars Banquet records as a companion album to the Random covers album of the preceding year. It contains new remixes in techno and house music styles by several club DJ's and mixers and was also released as a four LP set. These four vinyl LPs were again released separately as limited edition 12" singles on red (Random 2.1), green (Random 2.2), blue (Random 2.3) and clear (Random 2.4) vinyl.

The artwork is notable for being printed on rice paper.

Track listing
"Metal" (Remixed by Robert Armani) – 6:00
"Dans le Parc" (Remixed by DJ Hell) – 7:37
"I Die: You Die" (Remixed by Greenhaus) – 7:36
"Cars" (Remixed by Mike Dearborn) – 6:16
"Cars" (Remixed by Dave Clarke) – 5:11
"Warriors" (Remixed by Dave Angel) – 5:18
"Are 'Friends' Electric?" (Remixed by Liberator DJs) – 6:48
"Remember I Was Vapour" (Remixed by Steve Stoll) – 6:07
"We Are Glass" (Broken Glass Mix) (Remixed by Claude Young) – 6:20
"Films" (Remixed by Alex Hazzard) – 5:27
"The Iceman Comes" (Remixed by Peter Lazonby) – 7:09

References

1998 remix albums
Gary Numan remix albums
Beggars Banquet Records remix albums